Future of Music Coalition (FMC) is a U.S. 501(c)(3) national non-profit organization specializing in education, research and advocacy for musicians with a focus on issues at the intersection of music technology, policy and law.

Background 

Future of Music Coalition was founded in 2000 by Jenny Toomey, Kristin Thomson, Michael Bracy, Walter McDonough, and Brian Zisk.

Jenny Toomey and Kristin Thomson formed the indie rock band Tsunami in 1990 and ran the Arlington, VA-based independent label Simple Machines Records from 1990 to 1998. While running Simple Machines, Toomey and Thomson published four editions of The Mechanic's Guide, a do-it-yourself manual for the music business. Following the dissolution of Simple Machines for logistic and financial reasons, Toomey and Thomson worked with  the indie rock website Insound to launch The Machine, "an online forum dedicated to exploring the possibilities and pitfalls of digital music" from the perspective of indie labels and artists. The Machine ran from 1998 to 2000, and featured interviews with musicians, independent label heads and technologists, including future FMC co-founder Brian Zisk.

In June 2000, Toomey, Thomson, Bracy, McDonough and Zisk released "The Future of Music Manifesto" announcing the formation of Future of Music Coalition.

Toomey served as Executive Director of FMC until 2008, when she left to become the Media and Cultural Policy program officer for the Ford Foundation. Thomson served in various senior staff roles from FMC's founding until 2016.

Michael Bracy co-founded the independent label Misra Records in 1999. He joined the Future of Music Coalition in July 2001 as its Government Affairs Director. He currently serves as a co-founding emeritus member of FMC and is a partner in the government affairs firm Bracy Tucker Brown & Valanzano.

Walter McDonough is a lawyer and academic with a background in copyright, technology and the independent music industry. As an attorney, he has represented the Dresden Dolls and Mission of Burma, among others. He is currently a co-founding emeritus member of FMC, and serves on the board of performance rights organization SoundExchange.

Brian Zisk is an entrepreneur and technology industry consultant specializing in digital media, web broadcasting, and distribution technologies. Zisk founded the Internet radio station Green Witch in 1999 and co-founded the real-time search company Collecta in 2009. He currently serves as a co-founding emeritus member of FMC and is the founder and executive producer of the SF MusicTech Summit.

Musician Jean Cook joined the FMC staff in 2005. Prior to FMC she helped launch Air Traffic Control, a nonpartisan organization founded by and for artists. ATC was dedicated to helping progressive songwriters and musicians lend their talents, resources and energies to educate voters about the positions and records of elected officials and candidates and to create real change around a host of progressive issues.

Musician, educator and author Casey Rae served as CEO of FMC from 2013 to 2016.

Mission and activities 

FMC's stated mission is "to ensure a diverse musical culture where artists flourish, are compensated fairly for their work, and where fans can find the music they want."

FMC hosts public events, including the annual Future of Music Policy Summit; conducts original research; submits public comments, documents and testimony to legal proceedings; and organizes advocacy campaigns in an ongoing effort to raise awareness of policy issues in terms of their effect on working musicians and the independent music community.

FMC's current projects relate to issues of media ownership, particularly in the U.S. radio market; Internet and telecommunications policy; artist advocacy and community engagement; artist compensation in the music industry; and copyright.

In 2003, then Executive Director Jenny Toomey testified in front of the Federal Communications Commission about the results of FMC's research on radio consolidation, and its negative impacts on the music community.

In 2009, then Executive Director Jean Cook testified in front of the New York City Council about why net neutrality was important to musicians. In 2014, then VP for Policy and Education Casey Rae testified in front of the Senate Judiciary Committee about the importance of preserving an open internet.

Research

Major label contract clause critique 

In October 2001, FMC published its first major collaborative research project, a detailed breakdown of standard contracts offered by major labels. The report, compiled with the help of entertainment industry attorneys, paired potentially problematic contract clauses with "easy-to-understand critiques in the hopes that even those who are completely unfamiliar with the music business can understand the implications that result from signing a standard major label deal."

Effects of radio deregulation 

On November 18, 2002, FMC released a report entitled "Radio Deregulation: Has It Served Musicians and Citizens?" The report documented the effects of radio station ownership consolidation following the Telecommunications Act of 1996.

The report found that two parent companies, Clear Channel and Viacom, controlled 42 percent of listeners and 45 percent of industry revenues. Evidence of consolidation was "particularly extreme" in the case of Clear Channel: "Since passage of the 1996 Telecommunications Act, Clear Channel has grown from 40 stations to 1,240 stations — 30 times more than congressional regulation previously allowed. No potential competitor owns even one-quarter the number of Clear Channel stations. With over 100 million listeners, Clear Channel reaches over one-third of the U.S. population." The report also found that virtually every geographic market and music format were similarly controlled by oligopolies. The report concludes that "The radical deregulation of the radio industry allowed by the Telecommunications Act of 1996 has not benefited the public or musicians. Instead, it has led to less competition, fewer viewpoints, and less diversity in programming. Deregulation has damaged radio as a public resource."

Addressing the Future of Music Coalition Policy Summit in 2003, then-FCC Commissioner Jonathan Adelstein called the study "truly impressive".

On January 30, 2003, Jenny Toomey testified before the Senate Commerce Committee hearing on media ownership, alongside L. Lowry Mays (Clear Channel), Edward Fritts (National Association of Broadcasters), Robert Short (Short Broadcasting), and Don Henley of the Eagles (representing the Recording Artists Coalition).

In May 2003, during the FCC's quadrennial review of its broadcast media ownership regulations, FMC examined the contents of nearly 10,000 comments available for public review in the Federal Communications Commission Broadcast Ownership rulemaking (Docket 02-277). FMC's analysis found that, as of May 8, 2003, "96.8 percent of citizens filing comments opposed changing existing media ownership rules that would pave the way for further consolidation." Nevertheless, in June 2003, the FCC approved, by a 3-2 vote, new media ownership rules which removed many of the restrictions previously imposed to limit ownership of media within a local area.

In August 2006, FMC released a study documenting the effects of radio consolidation on employment and wages for radio announcers, news reporters and broadcast technicians from the years 1996 to 2003. The study found that, "comparing figures across metropolitan areas, an increase in the number of stations per owner within a metropolitan area was associated with both lower employment levels and lower wages."

In December 2006, FMC released "False Premises, False Promises", an in-depth follow-up to its 2002 study of the effects of the deregulation of radio station ownership. The 2006 report found that the top four radio station owners have almost half of the listeners; fifteen formats, which can overlap significantly in terms of the songs played, make up three-quarters of all commercial programming; and that "across 155 markets, radio listenership has declined over the past fourteen years, a 22% drop since its peak in 1989", leading FMC to conclude that contrary to the stated goals of FCC deregulation, "radio consolidation has no demonstrated benefits for the public."

Payola 

In 2008, Adam Marcus, working on behalf of FMC and the American Association of Independent Music, released "Change That Tune", a musician-oriented guide explaining the effects of payola and its ongoing impact on the ability of independent artists and labels to engage with the radio market in the 21st century. "Change That Tune" documents investigations by the New York State Attorney General and the FCC from 2003 to 2007, which uncovered "alarming evidence" that "payola was alive and well in the music and radio industries.”

In April 2009, FMC released "Same Old Song", a study of the composition of radio playlists nationwide between the years 2005 and 2008,  along with a companion study of playlist composition in the state of New York. Both reports found little measurable change in station playlist composition during that period, suggesting that major broadcasters' 2007 settlement with the FCC and the "rules of engagement" negotiated by the American Association of Independent Music in the wake of the investigation had not been effective in diversifying playlist content or ending payola practices.

Health Insurance
In March 2010, Future of Music Coalition conducted an online survey to gauge the level of health insurance among musicians. The survey found that, of the 1,451 respondents, 33 percent said they do not have health insurance. This was nearly twice the national average of 17 percent uninsured at the time, as estimated by the Kaiser Family Foundation. In 2013, prior to the beginning of many of the major provisions in the Affordable Care Act (ACA), the Future of Music Coalition (FMC) and the Artists’ Health Insurance Resource Center conducted an online survey of US-based artists across all disciplines about their access to insurance. The survey found that, of the 3,402 artist respondents, 43 percent did not currently have health insurance.

Artist Revenue Streams

In January 2011, FMC announced the Artist Revenue Streams research project, a multi-method research initiative funded by the Doris Duke Charitable Foundation to assess how US musicians and composers working in all genres are currently generating income. The project was inspired by the widely distributed article by Kristin Thomson entitled "The 29 Streams", noting the wide variety of ways that musicians and composers can make money from music. The research includes in-depth interviews with musicians and composers, case studies, and an online survey, open from September 6 to October 28, 2011. The resulting data set includes over 80 qualitative interviews, 7 case studies, and survey data from over 5,000 US-based musicians, and over 20 data memos, including "Roles, Revenue, and Responsibilities: The Changing Nature of Being a Working Musician", published in the international sociological journal Work and Occupations, and Money from Music: Survey Evidence on Musicians’ Revenue and Lessons About Copyright Incentives, published in the Arizona Law Review.

Campaigns

Rock the Net 

In October 2007, FMC launched the Rock the Net campaign, a coalition of musicians and labels who support network neutrality.

Network neutrality, or Net neutrality, sometimes described as the "open Internet", is the principle that preserves Internet access without restriction to the content, sites, platforms, equipment or modes of communication allowed. FMC explains its engagement in the issue thus: "All artists deserve the right to use the internet to cultivate listeners, and fans deserve to make their own choices of how and where to access legitimate content." Founding supporters of the Rock the Net campaign included R.E.M., Pearl Jam, Kronos Quartet, Boots Riley, Ted Leo, OK Go, Bob Mould (Hüsker Dü), Kathleen Hanna (Bikini Kill, Le Tigre), Death Cab for Cutie, and Jimmy Tamborello (the Postal Service).

In July 2008, FMC released the benefit compilation Rock the Net: Musicians for Net Neutrality on Thirsty Ear Recordings, featuring 15 tracks by Rock the Net participants including Bright Eyes, Wilco, Aimee Mann, Guster, They Might Be Giants, and the Wrens. Rolling Stone's Rock & Roll Daily called the compilation "one of the sexiest benefit records in some time."

Get the HINT 

In 2002, FMC conducted an online survey of working musicians to gauge their level of health insurance coverage. The survey found that, "of the nearly 2,700 respondents, 44 percent of them did not have health insurance." The report expressed concern for the lack of health insurance coverage among musicians and formulated a plan to address the issue.

In 2005, FMC received a grant from the Nathan Cummings Foundation to develop the Health Insurance Navigation Tool (HINT), a free call-in service offering musicians advice and information about their health insurance options. The HINT Program is led by Program Director Alex Maiolo, a musician and insurance specialist based in the Chapel Hill / Carrboro area of North Carolina.

In 2010, FMC conducted a follow-up survey which found that "of the 1,451 respondents, 33 percent said they do not have health insurance." Although the percentage of uninsured musicians had decreased since 2002, it was still nearly twice the national average of 17 percent uninsured, as estimated by the Kaiser Family Foundation in 2008.

I Support Community Radio 

FMC's "I Support Community Radio" campaign collects video testimonials from artists addressing the importance of non-commercial and community radio. Participants include Saul Williams, the Indigo Girls, David Harrington of the Kronos Quartet and Jon Langford of the Mekons.

Public performance right for sound recordings 

FMC supports the establishment of a public performance right for sound recordings.

Current U.S. Copyright law does not compensate performers or sound copyright owners for the broadcast of their recordings on terrestrial radio. The licensing arrangement for terrestrial radio stations compensates only the songwriter (or composer) and publisher for the over-the-air broadcasts of music. Meanwhile, the Digital Performance Right in Sound Recordings Act of 1995 and the Digital Millennium Copyright Act impose an alternate licensing agreement on digital audio streaming services, such as webcast and satellite radio, that compensates performers and sound copyright owners as well the other rightsholders who receive payment terrestrial plays.

In 2005, FMC began petitioning Congress to establish a public performance right for sound recordings in order to more equitably compensate all participants in the creative process and correct what it views an unnecessary exception within U.S. copyright law. In addition to a foreclosed revenue stream for artists and the lack of royalty parity for digital platforms, FMC has pointed to the majority of other developed nations with a public performance right for terrestrial radio play as another imbalance. Because of the lack of a reciprocal right between the U.S. and other countries, American performing artists are unable to collect on revenue generated from non-domestic airplay, an inequity likely to be ameliorated with the passage of performance rights legislation in the U.S.

References

External links
 Future of Music Coalition official site

Press coverage
 "Creative Rights & Artists." ArtsJournal.com: July 19–23, 2010. Blog discussion series hosted by the Future of Music Coalition, the National Alliance for Art Media + Culture, Fractured Atlas and ArtsJournal.com.
 Chaitovitz, Ann. "The Need for a Performance Right" (Op-ed) Huffington Post. 7 Jan 2009.
 Grebb, David. "Music Biz: Compromise Is Key." Wired. 7 Jan 2003. Coverage of the 2003 Future of Music Policy Summit.
 King, Brad. "Rocking in the Free World." Wired. March 2001.
 Lee, Jennifer 8. "Musicians Protesting Monopoly in Media." New York Times. 8 Dec 2003.
 Jenny Toomey's op-eds for the Nation.
 Ulaby, Neda. "Jenny Toomey, Rocking the FCC." NPR. 11 Feb 2004.
 Take John and Ken Off The Air | The National Hispanic Media Coalition

Music organizations based in the United States
Organizations established in 2000
Copyright law organizations